Southwest China is a region in the south of the People's Republic of China.

Geography

Southwest China is a rugged and mountainous region, transitioning between the Tibetan Plateau to the west and the Chinese coastal hills (东南丘陵) and plains to the east.  Key geographic features in the region include the Hengduan Mountains in the west, the Sichuan Basin in the northeast, and the karstic Yungui Plateau in the east.  The majority of the region is drained by the Yangtze River which forms the Three Gorges in the northeast of the region.

The narrowest concept of Southwest China consists of Sichuan, Chongqing, Yunnan, and Guizhou, while wider definitions often include Guangxi and western portions of Hunan.  The official government definition of Southwest China includes the core provinces of Sichuan, Chongqing, Yunnan, and Guizhou, in addition to the Tibet Autonomous Region.

History

Portions of Southwest China, including the land that is modern day Yunnan, Guizhou, and Sichuan, were incorporated into China in 230 BCE by Qin dynasty emperor Shi Huangdi.  Independent states would continue to exert influence within the region, with notable examples being the Nanzhao Kingdom in the 8th and 9th centuries CE and the Dali Kingdom in 10th and 11th centuries CE.  The region was largely pacified and incorporated into Ming domain. In the 13th century CE, the Yuan dynasty expanded its frontiers to include the Tibet plateau, which now defines China's current southwest frontier.

In the 18th century CE, control of the Tibet Plateau area was important in the Great Game confrontations between the imperial powers of Russia, Britain, and China.  

After the warlord governments of China's Republican era replaced the Qing dynasty, government policy towards the southwest largely became one of inaction. 

The Second Sino-Japanese War prompted the Nationalist government to focus increasingly on state-building tasks in the southwest. The city of Chongqing served as the capital of Chinese resistance to imperial Japanese expansion.

Western strategies to contain China in the 20th century CE included intervention in the Tibet plateau until almost the mid-1970s. Tibet became an increased area of concern in China's southwest after the Sino-Soviet split when Soviet soldiers on the border of Mongolia and China threatened to close the Gansu corridor, which would have left Tibet as the only reliable Chinese route to Xinjiang.

During the reform and opening up era, China began to look more seriously towards integrating its southwest regions. China's increased focus on trade-led development and its transition to a socialist market economy helped trigger a reorientation to the southwest as its lagging development became increasingly seen as an impediment to growth. China's southwest development initiatives reflect an awareness that economic engagement is the most cost-effective way to decrease political unrest and remedy underdevelopment along this frontier.

Demographics
The diverse areas of Southwest China carry strong regional identities and have been historically considered more rural than the more developed eastern regions of China.  Rapid development since the late 1970s has helped transform many parts of the region with modern advancements.  In the early 21st century, Southwest China contained 50% of the country's ethnic minority population which in turn formed 37% of the region's population.  Han Chinese migration has been largely concentrated in the urban centres while the rural areas are still predominantly made up by minority populations including the Zhuang, Miao, Yi, and others.

Inhabitants of Southwest China primarily speak a variant of Mandarin Chinese known as Southwestern Mandarin.  This variant uses the same written language as Mandarin but is only approximately 50% mutually intelligible with Standard Chinese.  As of 2012, there were approximately 260 million speakers of Southwestern Mandarin.

Administrative divisions

Cities with urban area over one million in population

 Notes

References 

Regions of China
South China
Western China